p120, and called catenin delta-1 is a protein that in humans is encoded by the CTNND1 gene.

Function 

This gene encodes a member of the Armadillo protein family, which function in adhesion between cells and signal transduction. Multiple translation initiation codons and alternative splicing result in many different isoforms being translated. Not all of the full-length natures of the described transcript variants have been determined.

Clinical significance

Either loss or cytoplasmic localization of p120 is a common feature in the progression of several types of carcinoma.

Interactions 
CTNND1 has been shown to interact with:

 Beta-catenin, 
 CDH1, 
 CDH2, 
 Collagen, type XVII, alpha 1, 
 Cortactin, 
 FYN, 
 MUC1, 
 Nephrin, 
 PSEN1,
 PTPN6, 
 PTPRJ, 
 PTPRM, 
 VE-cadherin, 
 YES1,  and
 ZBTB33

See also 
 Delta catenin
 Catenin
 CTNND2

References

Further reading

External links

 

Catenins
Armadillo-repeat-containing proteins